The Horse Whisperer may refer to a number of articles

In media
The Horse Whisperer (novel) (1995), a novel by Nicholas Evans
The Horse Whisperer (film) (1998), a film based on the novel, directed by and starring Robert Redford

In professions
A horse whisperer –  term for some practitioners of natural horsemanship

In people
A number of people are referred to as "the horse whisperer" or "a horse whisperer"
John Solomon Rarey (1827–1866), American horse trainer summoned by Queen Victoria to use his technique on "most ferocious horse in all England"
Buck Brannaman (real name Dan M. Brannaman, born January 29, 1962), named by Nicholas Evans as the primary inspiration for his book The Horse Whisperer

Monty Roberts (real name Marvin Earl Roberts, born May 14, 1935, American horse trainer and subject of a BBC/PBS documentary The Real Horse Whisperer
Daniel "Horse-Whisperer" Sullivan (died 1810), an Irish horse trainer